Roger Howard Stillwell (November 17, 1951 – February 19, 2006) was an American football defensive end and defensive tackle in the National Football League (NFL). He played college football for the Stanford Cardinals and later was drafted by the Chicago Bears in 1975. Roger only played for 4 seasons with the Bears and his career would be over by the young age of 26, due to numerous back and knee injuries.

References

1951 births
2006 deaths
American football defensive tackles
American football defensive ends
Chicago Bears players
Stanford Cardinal football players